George Banks Ready (born July 2, 1957) is an American attorney and politician who served as a member of the Mississippi State Senate. Winning election as a Democrat in 1991, he resigned from the Senate in November 1994, upon winning election as a circuit court judge in DeSoto County. Ready served in this position until 2004, when he left to return to private practice.

References

1957 births
Living people
Democratic Party Mississippi state senators
University of Mississippi alumni
University of Mississippi School of Law alumni
20th-century American politicians